Two-time defending champion Novak Djokovic defeated Roger Federer in the final, 6–3, 6–3 to win the men's singles tennis title at the 2011 Dubai Tennis Championships. It was Djokovic's second title of the season, after his triumph at the 2011 Australian Open, and 20th of his career. Djokovic joined Federer as the only two men to have won the tournament at least three times.

Seeds

Qualifying

Draw

Finals

Top half

Bottom half

References
 Main Draw
 Qualifying Draw

Dubai Tennis Championships - Singles
2011 Dubai Tennis Championships